1347 Patria, provisional designation , is a carbonaceous asteroid from the background population of the central asteroid belt, approximately 32 kilometers in diameter. It was discovered on 6 November 1931, by Soviet astronomer Grigory Neujmin at the Simeiz Observatory on the Crimean peninsula. The asteroid was named for the Latin word of fatherland.

Orbit and classification 

Patria is a non-family asteroid of the main belt's background population. It orbits the Sun in the central main-belt at a distance of 2.4–2.7 AU once every 4 years and 1 month (1,506 days; semi-major axis of 2.57 AU). Its orbit has an eccentricity of 0.07 and an inclination of 12° with respect to the ecliptic.

The body's observation arc begins a few days later at Vienna Observatory, almost 33 years prior to its official discovery observation at Simeiz.

Physical characteristics 

Patria is an assumed C-type asteroid.

Rotation period 

In October 2005, a first rotational lightcurve of Patria was obtained from photometric observations by French amateur astronomer Laurent Bernasconi. Lightcurve analysis gave a slightly longer-than average rotation period of 29.5 hours with a brightness amplitude of 0.12 magnitude.

Diameter and albedo 

According to the surveys carried out by the Infrared Astronomical Satellite IRAS, the Japanese Akari satellite and the NEOWISE mission of NASA's Wide-field Infrared Survey Explorer, Patria measures between 30.72 and 34.98 kilometers in diameter  and its surface has an albedo between 0.03 and 0.0462.

The Collaborative Asteroid Lightcurve Link derives an albedo of 0.0506 and a diameter of 32.48 kilometers based on an absolute magnitude of 11.3.

Naming 

This minor planet was named after "Patria", the Latin word for native country or fatherland. The official naming citation was mentioned in The Names of the Minor Planets by Paul Herget in 1955.

References

External links 
 Asteroid Lightcurve Database (LCDB), query form (info )
 Dictionary of Minor Planet Names, Google books
 Asteroids and comets rotation curves, CdR – Observatoire de Genève, Raoul Behrend
 Discovery Circumstances: Numbered Minor Planets (1)-(5000) – Minor Planet Center
 
 

001347
Discoveries by Grigory Neujmin
Named minor planets
19311106